James Leon Burtnett (May 30, 1943 – June 1, 2021) was an American football coach.  He served as the head football coach at Purdue University from 1982 to 1986, compiling a record of 21–34–1. He was a sales professional at Central Chevrolet in Jonesboro, Arkansas. 

In November 1981, Burtnett was promoted as Purdue's 30th head football coach. During the 1984 campaign, Burtnett's team posted its best season, in which the highlight of the year was beating number 2 Ohio State 28–23. The 1984 squad's 7–4 record earned Burtnett the Big Ten Coach of the Year, leading the Boilermakers to the Peach Bowl. His success that year earned him a contract extension through 1990. Burtnett's teams didn't improve after 1984, and after a 3–8 season in 1986, Burtnett resigned as head coach.

Burtnett has been an assistant coach for several schools, including Washington State University, San Jose State University, Michigan State University, Montana State University, Fresno State University, Colorado State University, Northeast Louisiana University, and Arkansas State University.  In addition, Burtnett was an assistant under former Purdue Alumnus Ron Meyer with the Indianapolis Colts of the National Football League (NFL). He died two days after his 78th birthday, on June 1, 2021.

Head coaching record

College

References

1943 births
2021 deaths
Arkansas State Red Wolves football coaches
Colorado State Rams football coaches
Fresno State Bulldogs football coaches
Houston Cougars football coaches
Indianapolis Colts coaches
Louisiana–Monroe Warhawks football coaches
Michigan State Spartans football coaches
Montana Grizzlies football coaches
Montana State Bobcats football coaches
Purdue Boilermakers football coaches
San Jose State Spartans football coaches
Washington State Cougars football coaches
Wyoming Cowboys football coaches
High school football coaches in Kansas
People from Meade County, Kansas